Miyagi Television Broadcasting (宮城テレビ放送) is the Nippon TV station (NNN and NNS) for Sendai. The channel is branded as Miyatere (ミヤテレ).

History

January 17, 1970 - MMT is founded.
October 1, 1970 - MMT begins broadcasting as a dual affiliate of ANN and NNN. The station was originally branded MTB.
September 1, 1975 - The station is rebranded as MM34 (JOMM-TV, channel 34).
September 30, 1975 - KHB begins broadcasting. MMT becomes a sole NNN/NNS station.
October 1, 1985 - The station is rebranded, this time as MMT.
March 31, 2012 - Analog broadcasts cease.

External links
 Official site 

Nippon News Network
Mass media in Sendai
Television stations in Japan
Television channels and stations established in 1970
Companies based in Sendai